Year 1267 (MCCLXVII) was a common year starting on Saturday (link will display the full calendar) of the Julian calendar.

Events 
 By topic 

 War and politics 
 February 16 – King Afonso III of Portugal and King Alfonso X of Castile sign the Badajoz Convention, determining the border between the Kingdom of Portugal and the Kingdom of León, and ensuring Portuguese sovereignty over Algarve.
 May 27 – Treaty of Viterbo: Emperor Baldwin II of Constantinople gifts the Principality of Achaea to King Charles I of Sicily, in the hope that Charles can help him restore the Latin Empire.
 The Second Barons' War in England ends, as the rebels and King Henry III of England agree to peace terms, as laid out in the Dictum of Kenilworth.
 Treaty of Montgomery: King Henry III of England acknowledges Llywelyn ap Gruffudd's title of Prince of Wales.
 The city of Ostrava is founded.

 Culture 
 Roger Bacon completes his work Opus Majus and sends it to Pope Clement IV, who had requested it be written; the work contains wide-ranging discussion of mathematics, optics, alchemy, astronomy, astrology, and other topics, and includes what some believe to be the first description of a magnifying glass. Bacon also completes Opus Minus, a summary of Opus Majus, later in the same year. The only source for his date of birth is his statement in the Opus Tertium, written in 1267, that "forty years have passed since I first learned the alphabet". The 1214 birth date assumes he was not being literal, and meant 40 years had passed since he matriculated at Oxford at the age of 13. If he had been literal, his birth date was more likely to have been around 1220.
 The leadership of Vienna forces Jews to wear Pileum cornutum, a cone-shaped head dress, in addition to the yellow badges Jews are already forced to wear.
 In England, the Statute of Marlborough is passed, the oldest English law still (partially) in force.

 By place 

 Asia and Africa 
 The "Grand Capital" is constructed in Khanbaliq (present-day Beijing) by Kublai Khan, having moved the capital of the Mongol Empire there three years prior.
 Malik ul Salih establishes Samudra Pasai, the first Muslim state in Indonesia.
 Spain attempts an invasion of Morocco, but the Marinids successfully defend against the invasion, and drive out Spanish forces.

Births 
 February 3 (or February 3, 1266) – Richard FitzAlan, 8th Earl of Arundel (d. 1302)
 August 10 – King James II of Aragon (d. 1327)

 Giotto di Bondone, Italian artist who marked the shift from medieval art to Proto-Renaissance art. (d. 1337)
 Roger de Flor, Sicilian military adventurer, leader of the mercenary group Catalan Company

Deaths 
 February 21 – Baldwin of Ibelin, Seneschal of Cyprus
 March 3 or 4 – Lars, Archbishop of Uppsala
 March 17 – Peter of Montereau, French architect (b. c. 1200)
 September 23 – Beatrice of Provence, countess regnant of Provence (b. 1234)
 November 26 – Sylvester Gozzolini, Italian founder of the Sylvestrines (b. 1177)
 November/December – Hugh II of Cyprus, king of Cyprus and regent of the Kingdom of Jerusalem. (b. 1253)
 date unknown – John FitzAlan, 6th Earl of Arundel, Breton-English nobleman and Marcher Lord (b. 1223)

References